San Ildefonso ( and Otomi Mangu) is a town of Tepeji del Río municipality, in central-eastern Mexico. It is a town near to Tula de Allende city.

As of 2010, the town had a total population of 4,423. 90% of the people speak otomi language.

References

Populated places in Hidalgo (state)
Otomi settlements